KKOY-FM (105.5 FM) is a radio station broadcasting a Top 40/CHR format. Licensed to Chanute, Kansas, United States, the station serves the Southeast Kansas area.  The station is currently owned by MyTown Media, LLC. Studios are located on North Plummer Avenue in Chanute, and its transmitter is located near Altoona.

History
105.5 signed on the air in 1971 broadcasting ABC Radio Network's Today's Best Hits satellite-fed Hot AC service with the name "Y105". The station was owned by Southeast Kansas Broadcasting, Inc. at the time. In 2004, the station cut the satellite feed and provided local programming and changed monikers to "Sunny 105.5". The ownership changed to MyTown Media, LLC in September 2008. In January 2009, the station evolved towards a Rhythmic-leaning CHR format and re-branded as "Hot 105", being one of only 2 Top 40 stations heard in Southeast Kansas with a good signal (the other being Joplin, Missouri's KSYN).

In September 2009, the station started dayparting with Hot AC material played throughout the day and retaining the Rhythmic-leaning CHR format after 9 pm. This would end in March 2011, when the station returned to a more balanced CHR format throughout the day. The station is noted for having a more diverse playlist by playing "non-charting" songs that other Top 40 stations may be late on or never play.

The station carries St. Paul High School Football and Basketball.

Trivia
On April 1, 2011, the station was temporarily replaced with a 90s Hits format dubbed "105.5 The Edge". The regular format would return later in the day; however, the success of the stunt on the station's Facebook page would result in the creation of "The 90s Rewind Show", aired weekend mornings and hosted by former afternoon DJ Paul Myers.

Current Jocks
Lindzey - Mornings
Rick Dees - Saturday/Sunday mornings
Romeo - Saturday Night Online - Saturday evenings

Former Jocks
"Uncle" Dave Lee-Afternoons (January 2009-August 2009) (Currently Operations Manager for Eagle Communications - North Platte, NE)Heard via Voicetracking on KFIX, KHMY, KSJQ and KELN. 
Cody-Mornings
Panama Jack-Mornings (syndicated through other MyTown Media stations)
Paul Myers-Afternoons
Big J-Nights

External links
Hot 105 Website
MyTown Media, LLC. Website

KOY-FM
Contemporary hit radio stations in the United States
Radio stations established in 1994
1994 establishments in Kansas